Chinamex (short for China Middle East Investment and Trade Promotion Centre) is a Chinese real estate developer specializing in the design and management of large malls and mixed use developments branded as Dragon Mart and Dragon City respectively that are located in foreign countries. The malls are shopping hubs for retail and especially wholesale sales of Chinese products.

Active projects

Dragon Mart Dubai

The first mall developed by the company is Dragon Mart in Dubai, United Arab Emirates, a sprawling development located at Dubai International City that was referenced in an article in The New York Times as a key project in the expansion of Chinese ties in the Persian Gulf countries. Dragon Mart 1 was established in 2004 and a second mall, Dragon Mart 2, was completed in December 2015.

Dragon City Bahrain
In September 2013, Chinamex signed a memorandum of understanding with the Diyar Al Muharraq authorities for the construction of a 120,000 m2 wholesale and retail mall entertainment complex in Bahrain branded as Dragon City. Nass Corporation was commissioned to build the mall. With an investment of $100 million, the Dragon City opened in December 2015. Characterized by its oriental architecture, it also included 300 residential apartments. Dragon City Bahrain is a first-of-its-kind development that encompasses over 787 commercial units, making it the largest wholesale and retail trading centre in the Kingdom of Bahrain.

6 months after the opening, 95% of store occupancy was reached. In November 2016, Chinamex allocated an extra $200 million to roll out the second part of the project: a palatial hotel, restaurants area, and a recreational area.

Canceled projects

Dragon Mart Cancún
In conjunction with Mexican investors, Chinamex commenced construction of Dragon Mart Cancún, a $US180-million investment that includes 3,000 storefronts along with apartments for the families of mall workers. ONGs and national institutions heavily criticized the project as soon as it was announced in 2011, arguing that the Mexican government did not conduct environmental impact assessments. Facing bad publicity, Chinamex rearranged its deal with its Mexican partners, allowing more countries to partake to the project, reducing the number of units reserved to Chinese businessmen, and giving up 10% of its 50-50 investment deal to the Mexican investors (60% MX, 40% CN). The project was approved on government and state levels by the end of 2012, but local authorities blocked and completely reversed the approval on all government levels.

Construction was then halted due to an environmental enforcement action by Profepa, the Mexican environmental protection agency. Dragon Mart was fined $555,000 in 2014 by Profepa for neglecting the conduction of environmental impact assessments. In January 2015, Profepa canceled the project and fined Dragon Mart an additional $1,5 million. An article in The Wall Street Journal noted that the planned DragonMart had unsettled Mexican business leaders who were anxious about losing market share to Chinese competition.

Panama: Dragon City
In 2014, Chinamex started investing in the development of a Dragon City in Panama. In 2015, a free trade agreement between Mexico and Panama became effective, and Chinamex was planning to turn the China-Panama-Mexico axis into a major export outlet of Chinese products towards the North and South American markets.

Chinamex USA
In December 2009, Chinamex opened offices in Atlanta. It had 14,000-square-foot facility used as a showroom of China-manufactured products. However, in July 2011, Chinamex closed its Atlanta offices, marking its retreat from the USA's markets.

References

External links
 Chinamex website
 Dragon City Bahrain website
 Dragon Mart Dubai website

2000 establishments in China
Chinese companies established in 2000
Real estate companies established in 2000
Real estate companies of China